Reza Parsa is a Swedish film director. At the age of 22, he was admitted to the 4-year directing program at the National Film School of Denmark (1991–95) and directed the most award-winning (11 awards) graduation film, Never (Gränsen), in the history of the school.

To date Reza Parsa has won more than 30 national and international awards, including the Ingmar Bergman Award, the Student Academy Award (Student Oscar) and prizes in Cannes Film Festival, Brasília, Seattle, Chicago, and San Sebastian.

Before the Storm Parsa's first feature film, is a suspense thriller which has achieved great critical success and has been sold to 35 countries worldwide, incl. The United States.

Reza Parsa and his screenwriter Johan Bergman Lindfors, both based in Sweden, are now preparing Parsa's next feature film.

National and International Awards

Credits

Director
The Haga Man (Hagamannen) (2009)
Meeting Evil (Möte med Ondskan) (2002)
Before the Storm (Före Stormen) (2000)
The 8th Song (Den 8:e Sången) (1998)
Tigerheart (Tigerhjärta) (1997)
Never (Gränsen) (1995)

Screenwriter
Meeting Evil (Möte med Ondskan) (2002)
Before the Storm (Före Stormen) (2000)
The 8th Song (Den 8:e Sången) (1998)
Never (Gränsen) (1995)

Creator of Documentary Concept
Aviation (2003)
Belas Dukkehus (2003)
It's All Good (2003)
Min Velsignede Bror (2003)
Det Ulogiske Instrument (2003)

External links

1968 births
Living people
Swedish film directors